Maktub is a Seattle, Washington-based music group formed in the late 1990s that combines elements of hip-hop, rhythm and blues, soul, and funk, with a sprinkling of jazz and rock.

History
Maktub was formed in 1996 when Davis Martin called Reggie Watts, a student at the Cornish College of the Arts at the time, to come jam with Kevin Goldman, Alex Veley, and himself.  After only 5 minutes of jamming, the band hit it off, and by day's end wrote their first song.  After realizing their potential, the four planned to commit to each other, calling themselves "Maktub".  According to their website, Maktub is an Arabic word that Reggie got from Paulo Coelho's novel The Alchemist, which translates to, "it is written", or, "destiny".

In August 1999, they released their first album, Subtle Ways.  There was an immediate response as the album hit number one on KCMU and later on the soul and urban charts at MP3.com and earned them "Best R&B Album" at the Northwest Music Awards".  After they released the album, Alex Veley decided to leave the group to pursue other projects.

In 2000, the group added a new sound to their music by recruiting Thaddeus Turner on guitar and Daniel Spils as their new keyboard player.  With the new members of the band, they began recording demos with a handheld MiniDisc and small button microphone.

In 2001 they recorded Khronos in only two weeks.  A year later (2002), after selling more than 20,000 copies, Velour Music in New York City took notice of their success and re-released Khronos nationally.  With this new national recognition, they embarked on a six-month tour in 2003, traveling all around the United States.  Upon their return to Seattle, they begin to write new songs and record new demos, most of which are done with their minidisc recorder and single button microphone.

In 2004, they recorded their third album, Say What You Mean.  The album was released in April, 2005 and was followed by a three-month tour around the continental United States.

2007 saw the anticipated release of Start It Over. This album marked a new trend in the band's deeper interaction with its followers.  It was funded by the members of their fan club, M.A.R.C. 7.

References

Rock music groups from Washington (state)
Jam bands
Jazz fusion ensembles
Musical groups from Seattle